Hypotia longidentalis is a species of snout moth in the genus Hypotia. It was described by Rothschild in 1913, and is known from Algeria.

References

Moths described in 1913
Hypotiini
Endemic fauna of Algeria
Moths of Africa